A fictional work (from 1953) by Pulitzer-prize winner Louis Bromfield, Up Ferguson Way would epitomize Bromfield's work. First appearing as a chapter in Pleasant Valley, Up Ferguson Way was set at the high-meadowed prairie at Malabar Farm that bore its name. William Ferguson was one of the earliest settlers to the valley. He had crossed the Alleghenies and struck a partnership with the native Delaware tribes in the area. Later, the log cabin in which he resided during these fur trading expeditions became his permanent home.

Although Ferguson's log cabin was later abandoned for a more modern structure, its steps are still evident within the wood line and just off the old wagon wheel grooved road. It was upon this meadow that Bromfield escaped the pressures of life. He felt as though he entered another world when he rose to the high land, and he thought it held a certain mystical power. It is rumored that a series of ley lines cross the beautiful valley wall. It is also true that an American Chestnut, one of the few still in Richland County, Ohio grows near Ferguson Meadow. And so this mystical place became the setting for this interesting chapter in Pleasant Valley.

Yet another twist evolves around the mysterious character named Zenobia. Phoebe Wise, an eccentric hermit from Mansfield Ohio, was later revealed to be the inspiration behind Zenobia. Phoebe was in fact a Bromfield relative whom the young man remembered from his childhood in Mansfield. She left such an impact on young Louis that her life would become intertwined in his fictional works.

Novels set in Ohio
1953 American novels
Novels by Louis Bromfield